Foued Ourabi (born 30 May 1975) is a Tunisian windsurfer. He competed at the 2004 Summer Olympics in the Men's Mistral sailboarding event.

References

External links
 
 

1975 births
Living people
Tunisian windsurfers
Tunisian male sailors (sport)
Olympic sailors of Tunisia
Sailors at the 2004 Summer Olympics – Mistral One Design